"Blow That Smoke" is a song by American electronic music group Major Lazer featuring Swedish singer Tove Lo, released on October 17, 2018 as the seventh and final single from Major Lazer Essentials, released two days later. It was premiered on Zane Lowe's show on Beats 1. It marks the first collaboration between the group and Lo.

Composition
"Blow That Smoke" is a tropical dance and electropop song rooted in Afropop with elements of dancehall and reggaeton. Tove Lo said she and the group "had a few sessions and tried to find more days together, but we're never in the same place long enough to actually make it work", so she sent Diplo her vocals for a song, which he liked and put to a track. Lo told Zane Lowe that she later heard the finished version of the song, which had been sped up about 10 BPM from what was a "very slow, moody song to begin with".

Critical reception
Billboards Marina Pedrosa called the song a "tropical dance anthem" as well as an "electropop tune" containing a "sultry beat with a dash of reggaeton" that Lo's "angelic voice" sings lyrics like "I got the keys to heaven now/Babes all around and they got my mind spinning" over. Mike Wass of Idolator positively contrasted the song with Lo's solo material, noting that on "Blow That Smoke" it sounds like she is having fun. Wass also stated that the song "sounds like a hit" and said Lo "coos over a mellow, island-inspired beat".

Writing for Dancing Astronaut, Chris Stack named it a continuation of Major Lazer's recent output "celebrating their Afrobeat roots" and also judged it had a "sultry island beat". Patrick Doyle of Rolling Stone felt that the song had "Afropop roots" as well as being a "bouncey stomper with a West African guitar riff and heavy groove". Winston Cook-Wilson of Spin named it a "Caribbean-flavored track that fits with Major Lazer's usual stylistic M.O. more closely than Tove Lo's usual, more acerbic sensibility". Jael Goldfine of Stereogum said it "might just be the lowest-key song either artist has ever made".

Promotion
Both Lo and Major Lazer announced on social media that they would be releasing a collaboration in the same week, with Lo calling it a "sweet surprise" and sharing a snippet of the track.

Charts

References

2018 singles
2018 songs
Major Lazer songs
Tove Lo songs
Song recordings produced by Diplo
Songs written by Diplo
Songs written by Ludvig Söderberg
Songs written by Tove Lo
Songs written by Jr Blender
Songs written by Jakob Jerlström
Songs written by Sibel Redžep